Sergei Sergeyevich Simonov (born 9 December 1983) is a former Russian professional football player.

Club career
He played two seasons in the Russian Football National League for FC Chernomorets Novorossiysk and FC Baltika Kaliningrad.

References

External links
 

1983 births
Living people
Russian footballers
Association football midfielders
FC Dynamo Kirov players
FC Chernomorets Novorossiysk players
FC Baltika Kaliningrad players
FC Tyumen players
FC Orenburg players
FC Neftekhimik Nizhnekamsk players
FC Volga Ulyanovsk players